Maksim Gaspari (26 January 1883 – 14 November 1980) was a Slovene painter best known for his paintings and illustrations as well as numerous postcards with folklore motifs and scenes from rural life.

Gaspari was born in Selšček above Cerknica in Inner Carniola in 1883. He studied drawing at the Academy of Fine Arts Vienna but was unable to support himself financially so he returned to Kamnik, where he lived before going to Vienna. Later he studied in Munich for a while and settled in Ljubljana in 1913, where he taught art. He died in Ljubljana in 1980.

Gaspari is today best known for his postcards with rural motifs and greetings as well as political messages. A collection of his postcards is held by the National and University Library in Ljubljana. He also illustrated numerous books and journals. He won the Levstik Award in 1949 for his illustrations of Korney Chukovsky's Čuri-Muri velikan (The Monster Cockroach). In 1953 he received the Prešeren Award for his achievements in painting.

From 1972 he was a regular member of the Slovenian Academy of Sciences and Arts.

References

External links

Slovenian male painters
Slovenian illustrators
Slovenian caricaturists
1883 births
1980 deaths
Levstik Award laureates
Prešeren Award laureates
Members of the Slovenian Academy of Sciences and Arts
20th-century Slovenian painters
20th-century Slovenian male artists
People from the Municipality of Cerknica